The 2019 Kashima Antlers season involved the team competing in the J1 League, they finished 3rd in the 2018 J1 League. They also competed in the J.League Cup, Emperor's Cup, and AFC Champions League.

Squad

Competitions

J1 League

League table

Results

J.League Cup

Results

Emperor's Cup

AFC Champions League

Group standings

Results

Round of 16

Quarter-finals

Statistics

Scorers

Clean sheets

References 

Kashima Antlers
Kashima Antlers seasons